The 1993 Humboldt State Lumberjacks football team represented Humboldt State University during the 1993 NCAA Division II football season. Humboldt State competed in the Northern California Athletic Conference in 1993.

The 1993 Lumberjacks were led by third-year head coach Fred Whitmire. They played home games at the Redwood Bowl in Arcata, California. Humboldt State finished with a record of four wins, six losses and one tie (4–6–1, 1–2–1 NCAC). The Lumberjacks were outscored by their opponents 180–249 for the season.

Schedule

Notes

References

Humboldt State
Humboldt State Lumberjacks football seasons
Humboldt State Lumberjacks football